The ancient Egyptian Papyrus stem hieroglyph is one of the oldest language hieroglyphs from Ancient Egypt. The papyrus stalk, (or stem) was incorporated into designs of columns on buildings, also facades, and is also in the iconographic art portrayed in ancient Egyptian decorated scenes.

The papyrus stem hieroglyph shows a single stalk and umbel of the plant. It is used for the color 'green', and for vigour, or youth-(growing things).

Language usage of papyrus stem

The basic usage of the papyrus stem hieroglyph is as an ideogram, (graphic picture), in the word for "papyrus stem", the w3dj, or the older representation of "uatch".

As the papyrus plant is from the Nile Delta, and is a symbol of Lower Egypt and its green and productive quality of food growing, the usage of the papyrus stem is also used to represent growth, vigour, youth, all things fresh, new and growing.

The green color, or the Nile Delta's connection to the Mediterranean Sea, gave rise to the word the "Great Green", the Mediterranean, and thus its hieroglyphic spelling of the sea, using the papyrus stem hieroglyph-(green, great, or green-great-sea-"w3dj-wr").

Other words in the family of  'w3dj' , or "uatch" words are related to: green, yellow green, green stones, eyepaint; also trees, plants, and amulets, to name a few.

Rosetta Stone examples
The Rosetta Stone use of the papyrus stem occurs in three places. The first half of the Rosetta Stone is represented by the Nubayrah Stele, lines N-1 to N-27, (the Rosetta starts at line N-22, and is from R-1 to R-14). Line N-19 of the Nubayrah Stele refers to the "Great Green", the Mediterranean Sea and uses the Papyrus with Cobra, (Gardiner No. M14).

The opening of the Decree of Memphis (Ptolemy V), (the Rosetta Stone) begins by addressing Ptolemy V Epiphanes and uses the papyrus stem in two lines, N-1, N-2 and addresses the gods and the Pharaoh as follows: (It illustrates the vigor aspect of the green papyrus stem)

...like a king upon the throne of his father, (the Two Ladies)-lord of the Vulture Crown-(Upper Egypt), lord of the Uraeus Crown-(Lower Egypt), mighty one of strength, establisher of the Two Lands-(i.e. Egypt), (papyrus stem for the Delta-north), benefactor of Ta-Mer, (i.e. Egypt), benevolent of heart towards the gods, the Horus, making vigorous the life of men and women-(2nd usage of papyrus stem), lord of the Sed festivals,...

Papyrus stem amulet
Besides the personal use of the amulet in life, the body was often provided with amulets in burial, with more amulets implying more protection. The most common funerary amulets were the heart scarab, Wadjet Eye, Djed Pillar amulet, Wadj amulet, Tyet amulet, and the Golden-vulture collar, (for goddess Mut). Amulet usage changed greatly over the millenniums of Ancient Egypt.

The papyrus stem, or Wadj amulet was made from 'green feldspar' as prescribed in Chapter 160, Charpter 159 from the Book of the Dead. The most common explanation for the amulet is that it provided 'eternal youth' to the deceased.

14 kaU of Ra-(Spirits of Ra)
{{Hiero|14 kaU of Ra, "Spirits of Ra"|F22:R12-N8-D40-S40-M13-G38-A50-D3-M44-R11-D4-D18-S32-F18|align=right|era=egypt}}
The papyrus stem is one of the 14 Spirits of Ra:

–"Word of Power":–see:
–light:–see: 
–strength:–see for similar use: Djsr (arm with powerstick)
–power:–see: Was

–vigour:–see: Papyrus stem (hieroglyph), Papyrus
–abundance:–see:
–majesty:–see: Hatshepsut-(the hieroglyph as a component of her name)
–burial:–see:

–preparedness:–see:
–stability:–see: Djed
–sight:–see: Eye of Horus
–hearing:–see:

–feeling, perception':–see: Rosetta Stone, used in line 13, before the 3-writing scripts, so that: "...each month, and each year, will know-(be cognizant-Grk: gnostic, 'gnorimon')), all the dwellers in Egypt,.." construct and erect a stone stele in script 1, script 2, etc....see:-Sia (god)-(deification of wisdom, Egyptian mythology)
–taste:–see:

Hieroglyph 13 for "feeling, perception" is not part of Gardiner's Sign List; the sign is similar to an upside-down pennant, or flag, positioned above the head of a seated man. A minor Egyptian god, Sia, can be found at the front of the Solar Barque, with other gods, leading pharaoh's bark, as Saa can "see", or "know" the path forward. Saa is pictured with the 'knowing'-gnostic sign on top of her head.

Iconography

Examples of iconographic use of the papyrus stem ranges to wall scenes, tombs, architectural components, including complete columns; also amulets. Besides the building columns as the papyrus stem, the pillars that support the sky, the four corners of the earth, were also sometimes represented by the papyrus stem, (Gardiner list no. O-40).

Gallery
Many artifacts of Ancient Egypt, as well as architecture elements used the papyrus stem motif. Some specific examples are the kohl spoons, or the papyrus handled mirror.

Papyrus-handled mirror

See also

Gardiner's Sign List#M. Trees and Plants
Gardiner's Sign List
List of Egyptian hieroglyphs
Wadjet
Wadj-wer

References

Budge.  An Egyptian Hieroglyphic Dictionary, E.A.Wallace Budge, (Dover Publications), c 1978, (c 1920), Dover edition, 1978. (In two volumes) (softcover)
Budge.  A Hieroglyphic Dictionary to the Book of the Dead, E.A.Wallace Budge, Dover edition, 1991; Original: c 1911 as: A Hieroglyphic Vocabulary to the Theban Recension of the Book of the Dead with an Index to All the English Equivalents of the Egyptian Words, (Kegan Paul, etc. Ltd, London, publisher). Dover: (softcover)
Budge.  The Rosetta Stone, E.A.Wallace Budge, (Dover Publications), c 1929, Dover edition(unabridged), 1989. (softcover)

External links
Amulets of Egypt & history of Mummification, Egypt; amulets: Djed Pillar, Staircase amulet, Headrest amulet, Heart amulet, Foot amulet & Hand amulet

Egyptian hieroglyphs: trees and plants